Indian Institute of Information Technology Bhopal is one among the 20 IIITs established under the non-profit Public-Private Partnership (PPP) model by Ministry of Human Resource Development. It is presently functioning inside the campus of Maulana Azad National Institute of Technology while 50 acres of land were identified for setting up a permanent campus.

References

External links 
 

Bhopal
Universities and colleges in Bhopal
2017 establishments in Madhya Pradesh
Educational institutions established in 2017